The Golden One is the 14th in a series of historical mystery novels, written by Elizabeth Peters and featuring fictional sleuth and archaeologist Amelia Peabody.

Plot summary
The Golden One is a combination of two stories.  The first story deals with the search for an unknown tomb, one where some artifacts have started to appear on the black market.  The second story follows Ramses Emerson as he is sent on another mission behind Turkish lines.

After arriving in Egypt in January, 1917, Amelia acquires a magnificent cosmetic jar with the cartouche removed.  Rumors of a new, previously untouched tomb are rife, and this is significant evidence.  After a brief stay in Cairo, the family moves on to their home in Luxor.  When the Emersons arrive in Luxor, they encounter Joe Albion and his family, a wealthy American collector of antiquities, who make no secret of his desire to deal on the black market.  Cyrus Vandergelt is acquainted with Joe Albion, and tells Emerson he would do anything to get what he wanted.  This riles Emerson, and relations with the Albions are frosty at best.

Jamil, a former employee and Jumana’s brother, is at the center of the rumors about the tomb.  Early in their excavations, the Emersons discover one looted tomb with links to Jamil.  They learn that he is manipulating a number of people and even attempts to kill Emerson and Peabody.  When his family confronts him, his ancient musket explodes, mortally wounding him.  But before he dies, he leaves a clue to the location of the tomb – “in the hand of the God”.  The Emerson and Vandergelt expeditions now try to figure out which “hand of the God” Jamil meant.

Just then Ramses is called back into service as an agent.  An English spy, claiming to have converted to Islam, has become a tool of the Turks and is now known as Ismail, the Holy Infidel.  Ramses is sent to discover if the turncoat is Sethos.  It so happens that Ismail is in Gaza, just inside the Turkish lines.  Ramses is forced to take a novice agent with him as well, but manages to get into Gaza without much trouble.  While trying to get a look at Ismail, Ramses companion fires at Ismail and misses.  In the confusion, Ramses is caught but the other agent makes his escape.

The head of the Turkish secret service, Sahin Pasha, takes possession of Ramses, but makes a surprising offer: convert to Islam and marry his daughter, Esin, and he will set Ramses free.  While Ramses is left to consider the offer in a dungeon, Esin engineers Ramses’ escape.

Meanwhile, the Emersons, who had secretly arrive in a town just behind the British lines, are ready to come to Ramses aid if needed.  They get word of his capture and are working out a rescue plan when Ramses shows up.  They prepare to make their getaway when Sethos also appears, with Esin in a rug.  They are forced to escape to a temporary hiding place, where they again encounter Sethos.  He was indeed Ismail, sent to destroy Sahin Pasha, which he has done by humiliating him.  But his work is not done and he returns to Gaza.

As the Emersons are about to leave for Cairo, Sahin appears, hoping to regain his status by returning with both his daughter and Ramses.  Though he wounds Ramses, Emerson captures him, and they all return to Cairo.  Sahin Pasha is turned over to the authorities, and Esin is sent to a secure home.

When the Emersons return to Luxor, they concoct a story that for most people would be implausible, but does bear some resemblance to previous adventures, so no one asks much about it.

However, the tomb is still undiscovered.  The Albions are making it clear that nothing will stop them from getting what they want, and they seek to abuse Jumana’s trust as one means of doing so.  Both Bertie Vandergelt and Ramses have encounters with the Albion son.

When Jumana is caught by Peabody sneaking into the compound one night, Peabody assumes the worst and decides to harshly punish her.  Peabody is terribly disappointed, and feels that Jumana has abused her position of trust in the family.

But that morning, Cyrus and Bertie appear, unable to contain their excitement.  Bertie, with help from Jumana, has found the tomb in the hills above Deir el Medina.  The two of them had been climbing for the last few nights around a rock formation that looked like a fist, the “Hand of the God”.  It is a royal cache, containing the mummies and funerary times of four of the Wives of the God.  Peabody realizes her mistake and for once is contrite about jumping to conclusions.

Sethos reappears, and is amazed at the discovery.  He also warns Emerson of the Albions.  Sethos considers them unscrupulous, a serious charge coming from Sethos.  But the Albions appear again, making it clear that they expect to get some of the items from the tomb.  When they are sent away by Emerson and Cyrus, they decide to try force.  Sethos warns Emerson, and the Emersons and Vandergelts ambush the Albions and their hired thugs.  Caught by Emerson and Vandergelt, the Albions are forced to give up the few items they had bought from Jamil, and then disappear.

The only thing left is the announcement that Ramses and Nefret are going to have a baby.

Title
The title of the book refers to the goddess Hathor:

Awards
The novel was nominated for an Agatha Award in the "Best Novel" category in 2002.

See also

List of characters in the Amelia Peabody series

References

2002 American novels
Amelia Peabody
Novels set in Egypt
Fiction set in 1917